Fincastle is a locality in Alberta, Canada.  It is located east of Taber in the southeastern portion of the province.

The locality was named after the Viscount of Fincastle, a title related to the Earl of Dunmore.

The postal code of Fincastle is T0K 1X0, which belongs to the district of Purple Springs, AB.

References 

Localities in the Municipal District of Taber